Wurfbainia villosa, also known by its basionym Amomum villosum, is a plant in the ginger family that is grown throughout Southeast Asia and in South China. Similar to cardamom, the plant is cultivated for its fruits, which dry into pods when mature and contain strongly aromatic seeds. W. villosa is an evergreen plant in the ginger family, grow in the shade of the tree, 1.5 to 3.0 m high, whose branches and leaves are similar to ginger's. W. villosa has a characteristic that flowers spread on the ground can bear fruit while flowers on the branches can not. Its flowers bloom in March and April and are the colour of white jade.

Use in cuisine 
The Wurfbainia villosa seed is used as a spice, including some versions of five-spice powder in Chinese cooking. The pods are used in Chinese cuisine for flavour. Since the Tang dynasty, many ancient books, such as the Compendium of Materia Medica, say W. villosa tastes acrid, fresh, and slightly bitter.

Conservation 
Due to the demand for seeds and ripe fruits, and to curb slash-and-burn activities in forests by local populations, cultivation of W. villosa and coplantings with rubber trees has been encouraged by the governments of Yunnan and Guangdong, China. However, the extensive cultivation of W. villosa in forests has resulted in the reduction of species diversity in the rainforests of Southwest China.

References

External links 
 

villosa
Flora of Indo-China
Spices